"Hey Loretta" is a single by American country music artist Loretta Lynn. Released in October 1973, it was the second single from her album Love Is the Foundation. The song peaked at number 3 on the Billboard Hot Country Singles chart. It also reached number 1 on the RPM Country Tracks chart in Canada.

Chart performance

References

1973 singles
Loretta Lynn songs
Songs written by Shel Silverstein
Song recordings produced by Owen Bradley
Decca Records singles
1973 songs